Pliolophus is an extinct equid that lived in the Early Eocene of Britain.

See also

 Evolution of the horse

References

Eocene horses
Prehistoric placental genera
Eocene odd-toed ungulates
Eocene genus extinctions
Eocene mammals of Europe
Taxa named by Richard Owen
Fossil taxa described in 1858